World Boogie Is Coming is the eighth studio album by American band North Mississippi Allstars. It was released on September 3, 2013 via Songs of the South Records. Recording sessions took place at Arlyn Studios in Austin and at Zebra Ranch Studios in Independence. Production was handled by Cody and Luther Dickinson.

Critical reception 

World Boogie Is Coming was met with generally favorable reviews from music critics. At Metacritic, which assigns a normalized rating out of 100 to reviews from mainstream publications, the album received an average score of 79, based on nine reviews.

AllMusic's Steve Leggett praised the album, saying: "NMA's version of Junior Kimbrough's "Meet Me in the City" here almost sounds like power pop, but filtered through a rustic moonshine filter. Every track here is like that, roaring into the 21st century sounding big, urgent, and huge, but so grounded in the local folk-blues tradition that each track seems to carry imprinted DNA that says boogie all over it". Randall Roberts of Los Angeles Times found the album "chaotic and expansive in the best sense: The Allstars attack many blues and southern rock ideas--and let loose doing it. As a result, World Boogie feels like a journey". Hal Horowitz of American Songwriter wrote: "By smartly abandoning the hip-hop and indie rock impulses that have appeared on, and arguably watered down, previous NMAS releases, the brothers Dickinson focus on what they do best; grind out muddy boogie with the pulsating, sweat soaked intensity of those that originated the rustic music they clearly love". Fred Mills of Blurt wrote: "their latest, crammed with 17 tracks, will likely be a case of too much of a good thing for all but the hardcore fans". Robin Denselow of The Guardian wrote: "the album succeeds because it has a freshness, raw energy and attack reminiscent of the way Mama Rosin re-work Cajun music".

Track listing

Charts

References

External links 

2013 albums
North Mississippi Allstars albums